Joe Bailey Cheaney (December 30, 1902 – March 16, 1983) was an American football and basketball coach.  He was served two stints as the head football coach at Howard Payne University in Brownwood, Texas, from 1928 to 1934, and 1946 to 1947, and one stint at Southwest Texas State University—now known was Texas State University—from 1935 to 1942, compiling a career college football coaching record of 81–62–14.  His career coaching record at Howard Payne was 58–19–9.

Cheaney was born on December 30, 1902, in Ranger, Texas. He graduated from Santa Anna High School in Santa Anna, Texas in 1921 and Howard Payne in 1925. He started in football as a halfback at Howard Payne, leading the Yellow Jackets to the Texas Intercollegiate Athletic Association (TIAA) title in 1924. He also was a sprinter on the track and field team, winning the TIAA championships for three years in the 100-yard and 200-yard dashes. Cheaney began his coaching career in 1925 as the football coach at San Marcos Baptist Academy in San Marcos, Texas.

Cheane died on March 16, 1983, in San Marcos.

Head coaching record

College football

References

External links
 

1902 births
1983 deaths
American football halfbacks
American male sprinters
Howard Payne Yellow Jackets men's basketball coaches
Howard Payne Yellow Jackets football coaches
Howard Payne Yellow Jackets football players
Texas State Bobcats football coaches
Texas State Bobcats men's basketball coaches
College men's track and field athletes in the United States
High school football coaches in Texas
People from Ranger, Texas
People from Santa Anna, Texas
Coaches of American football from Texas
Players of American football from Texas
Basketball coaches from Texas
Track and field athletes from Texas